Vladislaus I (c. 1065 – 12 April 1125) was Duke of Bohemia from 1109 to 1117 and from 1120 until his death.

Life
Vladislav I was a son of Vratislaus II of Bohemia by his second wife Svatava, a daughter of Casimir I of Poland. Together with his cousin Svatopluk, Vladislav expelled his brother Bořivoj II from Bohemia in 1107. In 1109, Svatopluk was killed during a campaign in Poland, and Vladislav I succeeded him as Duke of Bohemia. Bořivoj II returned from exile with the support of Prince Bolesław III Wrymouth of Poland, but was defeated and imprisoned by Vladislav in 1110. 

In spite of his victory, Vladislav I remained under Polish pressure and was forced to recognize a younger brother, Soběslav, as subordinate ruler of Moravia in Znojmo. In 1117, Vladislav I formally abdicated in favor of Bořivoj II, but retained much of the actual power. In 1120, Bořivoj was deposed again and endowed with Znojmo, while Vladislav resumed the throne, which he held until his death in 1125. 	 

Vladislav I ruled in a difficult time with considerable success. Although he continued to acknowledge the suzerainty of the Holy Roman Empire, he weathered the interventions of Poland into Bohemian affairs, conflicts with his kinsmen in Moravia, and undertook offensive campaigns against both Poland and Austria. In 1110–11, Vladislav accompanied Emperor Henry V on his Italian expedition, and he encouraged continued German settlement into Bohemia's border regions.

Abbey Kladruby
In 1115, the Benedictine abbey of Kladruby, west of Pilsen, was established,  with Vladislav endowing the abbey with 25 manors and the lordship of Zbraslav. Although by 1117, he had enlarged the abbey with six monks and six lay brethren.

Family 	 
By his wife Richeza of Berg (died 27 September 1125), daughter of Count Henry I of Berg. They had: 	 
 Svatava
 Vladislav II of Bohemia (c. 1110 – 18 January 1174), King of Bohemia
 Děpold I of Jamnitz (died August 1167)     	
 Jindřich (Henry) (d. after 1169), married to Margaret. His son Bretislav became bishop of Prague and later duke of Bohemia as Bretislav III.

See also 
Battle of Olšava

References

Sources 

1060s births
1125 deaths
11th-century Bohemian people
Dukes of Bohemia
Roman Catholic monarchs
Czech Roman Catholics
Czech people of Polish descent
Nobility from Prague
Sons of kings

Year of birth uncertain